Bang-Bang-a-Boom! is a Big Finish Productions audio drama based on the long-running British science fiction television series Doctor Who. The title is a parody of Lulu's 1969 Eurovision Song Contest winning entry Boom Bang-a-Bang.

Plot
On the space station Dark Space 8, the Seventh Doctor and Mel arrive at the hosting of the Intergalactic Song Contest when a series of murders threatens the peace of the galaxy.

Cast
The Doctor — Sylvester McCoy
Mel — Bonnie Langford
Waiter — Barnaby Edwards
Doctor Eleanor Harcourt — Sabina Franklyn
Professor Ivor Fassbinder — Graeme Garden
Geri Pakhar — Jane Goddard
Mister Loozly — Nickolas Grace
Lieutenant Stringberg — Vidar Magnussen
Queen Angvia — Patricia Quinn
Nicky Newman — Anthony Spargo
Commentator Logan — David Tughan

Notes
The Intergalactic Song Contest is a parody of the Eurovision Song Contest while Commentator Logan (who speaks with an Irish accent) is based upon and named after Terry Wogan, who provided commentary for the Eurovision on BBC One every year from 1980 to 2008. Like Wogan, he is seemingly known for his sardonic wit and frequently mentions his wife during broadcasts.
In The One Doctor, it was first mentioned that "I Will Survive" was the national anthem of Earth.
Professor Fassbinder and Dr Harcourt are parodies of Victor Bergman and Helena Russell in Space: 1999 (Fassbinder and Bergman are both the names of cinema pioneers). The station name Dark Space Eight is a parody of Star Trek: Deep Space Nine.
Pakhars are also included in the Unbound story He Jests at Scars...
According to The Sound of Fear this particular show was attended by Iris Wildthyme and the man she married the previous night.
Nickolas Grace later appeared as Albert Einstein in the Script to Screen-winning episode "Death is the Only Answer".

External links
Big Finish Productions – Bang-Bang-a-Boom!

2002 audio plays
Seventh Doctor audio plays